American Son is a 2008 drama film directed by Neil Abramson and starring Nick Cannon, Melonie Diaz and Matt O'Leary. The film follows a young man, Mike (Cannon) as he returns home to Bakersfield, California for Thanksgiving leave. Mike faces telling his friends and family of his nearby deployment to Iraq while dealing with a troublesome home life.

It competed in the Dramatic Competition at the 2008 Sundance Film Festival.

Plot
A 19-year-old who has enlisted to go to Iraq falls in love with a girl, but is afraid that he might not come back alive.

A young Marine named Mike (Nick Cannon) is shipping out for uncertain fortunes in Iraq, and has 4 days left to visit back home in Bakersfield California. The story is about his parting relationships with his best friend Jake (Matt O'Leary), a new girlfriend Christina (Melonie Diaz), his mother Donna (April Grace), and father Eddie (Chi McBride) over these 96 hours. None of these people initially knows he's shipping out, and each of the significant other's reactions to this news, one-on-one with Mike, make up the bulk of the story. The story also gives some insight into Mike's motives as to why he enlisted in the first place.

References

External links
 
 

2008 films
2000s war drama films
American independent films
Iraq War films
American war drama films
2008 independent films
2008 drama films
2000s English-language films
2000s American films